Lily Plain is an area in Saskatchewan, Canada, located approximately 20 kilometres west of Prince Albert, Saskatchewan.  In the area there is a community hall called "Lily Plain Community Hall", and in the parking lot for the hall are postboxes for residents in the area. The main access into this area is the Saskatchewan Highway 302W.

Unincorporated communities in Saskatchewan